Jackie Wiid (April 19, 1929 – February 28, 1992) was a South African swimmer who competed in the 1948 Summer Olympics.

See also
 List of Commonwealth Games medallists in swimming (men)

References

1929 births
1992 deaths
South African male swimmers
Male backstroke swimmers
Olympic swimmers of South Africa
Swimmers at the 1948 Summer Olympics
Swimmers at the 1950 British Empire Games
Commonwealth Games gold medallists for South Africa
Commonwealth Games medallists in swimming
Afrikaner people
Medallists at the 1950 British Empire Games